Blaže Ristovski (March 21, 1931, Garnikovo, Kavadarci, Kingdom of Yugoslavia – November 28, 2018, Skopje, Macedonia, both in present-day North Macedonia) was a Macedonian linguist, folklorist and historian.

He graduated from Faculty of Philology in Skopje with a PhD in Philology. He was the director of the Institute of Folklore "Marko Cepenkov" in Skopje and a member of the Macedonian Academy of Sciences and Arts and honorary member of the Writers' Association of Macedonia. He died on November 28, 2018, at the age of 87.

Bibliography
 Krste P. Misirkov (1874–1926) (1966)
 Vardar, scientific and literary and socio-political journal of K. Q. Misirkov (1966)
 Growers in the development of Macedonian national thought (1968)
 Macedonian nation and Macedonian national consciousness (1968)
 Krste Misirkov (1968)
 Nace D. Dimov (1876–1916) (1973)
 George M. Pulevski and his books "Macedonian Fairy" and "Macedonian singer" (1973)
 Macedonian narodnoosloboditelni Poems (1974)
 Dimitri Cupovski (1878–1940) and the Macedonian scientific literature fellowship in St. Petersburg
 Contributions to the study of the Macedonian-Russian ties and the development of Macedonian national thought, in two books (1978)
 Macedonian verse 1900–1944, two books (1980)
 Manifestations and profiles of the Macedonian literary history, two books (1982)
 Macedonian nation and Macedonian nation, two books (1983)
 Koco Racin. Historical and literary studies (1983)
 Ikonomov Basil (1848–1934) (1985)
 Krste Misirkov (1874–1926) (1986)
 Macedonian folklore and national consciousness, two books (1987)
 Portraits and processes of the Macedonian literature and national history, three books (1989–1990)
 Sermon on the work of Vaptsarov (1990)
 Krste P. Misirkov, Selected pages (1991)
 Racin Macedonian narodnoosloboditelni Poems (1993)
 Macedonian Chronicles, two books (1993)
 Macedonia and the Macedonian nation (1995)
 Gorgija M. Pulevski, landmark in our cultural and national history (1996)
 Ceko Stefanov Popivanov: Earth, play in three acts (1996)
 Dimitri Cupovski and Macedonian national consciousness (1996)
 National Thought in Misirkov (1997)
 Early manuscripts of Krste P. Misirkov Macedonian (1998)
 Dimitar Tues Macedonian (1999)
 History of the Macedonian nation (1999)
 Macedonian Encyclopedia (2009) editor

See also
 Macedonian language
 Macedonian literature
 Macedonian studies

References

1931 births
2018 deaths
Deputy Prime Ministers of North Macedonia
Macedonian writers
Yugoslav writers
20th-century male writers
Yugoslav historians
People from Kavadarci Municipality
Macedonists
Slavists